Kelly Evans (born July 17, 1985) is an American journalist and co-anchor of Power Lunch on the CNBC business news channel. She was previously based in CNBC Europe's London, England, headquarters from May 2012 to May 2013 and is now based in CNBC's headquarters in New Jersey. Prior to joining CNBC, she was an economics reporter at The Wall Street Journal where she wrote the "Ahead of the Tapes" column, wrote for "Heard on the Street", and hosted the daily "News Hub" on WSJ.com. Before joining CNBC she was a regular guest on various television news programs.

Background
Evans was born in Syracuse, New York, and raised in Lexington, Virginia, Rockbridge County, near the Blue Ridge Mountains. At Rockbridge County High School she earned eight letters in lacrosse, cross country and track.

She then attended Washington and Lee University where she was a George Washington Honor Scholar which earned her a full-ride academic scholarship and graduated magna cum laude with a bachelor's degree in business journalism. She was a four-time scholar athlete, co-captain of the women's lacrosse team (First Team All-State, a First-Team All-ODAC and a First Team All-Region selection) and a national leadership society Omicron Delta Kappa.

On April 22, 2017, she married CNBC's sports reporter Eric Chemi. They have four children.

Career
Evans started at the Wall Street Journal in 2007, covering real estate and economics. She also worked there as a reporter for the Global Economics bureau.  Evans was one of the moderators for a 2012 Republican Primary debate in Myrtle Beach, South Carolina. She also moderated a James Carville v. Ann Coulter debate, part of the 25th annual mock convention event at her alma mater. She has been compared to former CNBC host Erin Burnett, who left the cable business channel to anchor a news program on CNN.

At CNBC, Evans co-hosted Closing Bell following the departure of Maria Bartiromo in 2013 until 2018 when CNBC moved Evans to their new show, The Exchange. Sara Eisen would replace Evans as co-host of Closing Bell.

References

1985 births
American expatriates in China
American expatriates in Hong Kong
American expatriates in England
American television news anchors
American women television journalists
CNBC people
Living people
People from Lexington, Virginia
People from Syracuse, New York
The Wall Street Journal people
Washington and Lee University alumni